Tereza Nvotová (born 22 January 1988) is a Slovak actress and director. She is the daughter of actress Anna Šišková and film director Juraj Nvota.

Selected filmography 
10 Rules (2014)

References

External links

1988 births
Living people
Slovak film actresses
Slovak women film directors
Actors from Trnava
21st-century Slovak actresses